Malte Beermann (born 31 March 1992) is a German footballer who plays as a midfielder for TuS Blau-Weiß Lohne.

Career
Beermann made his professional debut for Werder Bremen II in the 3. Liga on 5 May 2012, coming on as a substitute in the 67th minute for Florian Nagel in the 0–1 away loss against Arminia Bielefeld.

Personal life
Beermann's older brother, Timo, is also a professional footballer.

References

External links
 
 
 Profile at kicker.de
 Werder Bremen III statistics at Fussball.de
 Blau-Weiß Lohne statistics at Fussball.de
 Blau-Weiß Lohne II statistics at Fussball.de

1992 births
Living people
People from Osnabrück (district)
Footballers from Lower Saxony
German footballers
Association football midfielders
SV Werder Bremen II players
BV Cloppenburg players
SV Rödinghausen players
3. Liga players
Regionalliga players